Van Wagenen Stone House and Farm Complex, also known as Het Kilities Landt, is a historic home and farm complex located at Rochester in Ulster County, New York.  The property includes the house, bank barn (c. 1880), small shed (c. 1890), storage barn (c. 1920), small barn with attached shed (c. 1920), and a garden shed (c. 1890). Also on the property are the remains of a smokehouse and the dug well. It is a -story, linear stone dwelling dated to the early 18th century.  The front features five irregularly spaced dormers.

It was listed on the National Register of Historic Places in 1999.

References

Houses on the National Register of Historic Places in New York (state)
Federal architecture in New York (state)
Houses in Ulster County, New York
National Register of Historic Places in Ulster County, New York